Poonawalla Fincorp Limited, (formerly known as Magma Fincorp) is a Cyrus S. Poonawalla group Non-Banking Finance Company (NBFC) that focuses on consumer and MSME financing.
The company operates more than 279 branches in 21 states, as of 2022.

History

1988–2020: As Magma Fincorp 
The company was incorporated in 1988 by Mayank Poddar and Sanjay Chamria as Magma Leasing Limited. The company commenced operation in 1989. In 1996, the company entered retail financing business for vehicles and construction equipment.

In 2000, with the acquisition of Consortium Finance Ltd, the company expanded its network across Northern India. In 2007, Shrachi Infrastructure Finance merged with the company increasing the company's footprint in southern and western India. In the same year, the company formed a joint venture with International Tractors Limited (ITL) to enter tractor financing business. In 2008, the company re-branded and renamed itself as Magma Fincorp Limited.

In 2009, the company inked a joint venture with German insurer HDI Global to enter general insurance business. The company commenced operations in 2012. The same year, the company picked up 7% stake in the newly formed Experian Credit Information Company of India Pvt Ltd, the Indian arm of the global credit information services company. In 2011, global PE firm Kohlberg Kravis Roberts and International Finance Corporation, an arm of the World Bank Group, invested about $100 million in the company. In 2012, the company acquired GE Money Housing Finance and home equity loan portfolio of GE Money Financial Services from GE Capital India.

In March 2015, Magma Fincorp received Rs. 500 Cr investment from KKR, Indium V and LeapFrog Investments

In 2016, Mayank Poddar stepped down as the chairman. In April 2018, Magma Fincorp raised Rs. 500 Cr investment through QIP

2021–present: Under Poonawalla Group 
The company announced a major financial investment by Rising Sun Holdings, an Adar Poonawalla controlled company in February 2021. Magma HDI announced capital infusion in March 2021 by ICICI Ventures, Cyza Chem and Morgan Stanley. Subsequent to the investment by Rising Sun Holdings, the name of the company was changed from Magma Fincorp to Poonawalla Fincorp on 22 July 2021.

References 

Companies based in Pune
1988 establishments in West Bengal
Financial services companies established in 1988
Indian companies established in 1988